Pataki or Pataky is a Hungarian surname that literally means "from Patak". "Pataki" can also translate into "near a creek" or "someone who lived by a brook or a stream".

Notable bearers include:
Pataki
Allison Pataki (born 1984), American author
Andrew Pataki (1927–2011), Bishop Emeritus of Passaic for the Byzantines
Ferenc Pataki (1917–1988), Hungarian gymnast, Olympic champion
George Pataki (born 1945), Governor of New York (1995–2006)
Ladislav Pataki (1946–2007), Slovak-American coach, sports scientist, masters track & field thrower
Libby Pataki (born 1950), wife of George Pataki, First Lady of New York (1995–2006)
Michael Pataki (1938–2010), American actor
Mihály Pataki (1893–1977), Hungarian amateur football player
Zita Pataki (born 1973), Hungarian news reporter
Pataky
Attila Pataky (born 1951), Edda Művek vocalist
Bill Pataky (1930–2004), Canadian Olympic basketball player (1952)
Elsa Pataky (born 1976), Spanish model and actress
Etelka Barsi-Pataky (1941–2018), Hungarian politician

Fictional characters 
Helga G. Pataki, character on Hey Arnold!

See also 
Potok, Potocki (Slavic term)

Surnames
Hungarian-language surnames

de:Pataki
de:Pataky
hu:Pataki